The Grit of a Jew is a 1917 British silent drama film directed by Maurice Elvey and starring Augustus Yorke, Manora Thew and Fred Groves.

Cast
 Augustus Yorke as Moses Levi  
 Manora Thew as Leah  
 Fred Groves as Russell 
 Marguerite Blanche as Elsie Maudsley   
 Hayford Hobbs as Ben Levi 
 Rachel de Solla as Mrs. Levi 
 Cecil Mannering
 Frank Stanmore
 Fred Morgan
 Will Asher
 Inez Bensusan

References

Bibliography
 Murphy, Robert. Directors in British and Irish Cinema: A Reference Companion. British Film Institute, 2006.

External links
 

1917 films
British drama films
British silent feature films
1910s English-language films
Films directed by Maurice Elvey
1917 drama films
British black-and-white films
1910s British films
Silent drama films